A tsunami is a series of water waves caused by the displacement of a large volume within a body of water, often caused by earthquakes, or similar events. This may occur in lakes as well as oceans, presenting threats to both fishermen and shoreside inhabitants. Because they are generated by a near field source region, tsunamis generated in lakes and reservoirs result in a decreased amount of warning time.

Causes

Inland tsunami hazards can be generated by many different types of earth movement. Some of  these include earthquakes in or around lake systems, landslides, debris flow, rock avalanches, and glacier calving. Volcanogenic processes such as gas and mass flow characteristics are discussed in more detail below. Tsunamis in lakes are very uncommon.

Earthquakes

Tsunamis in lakes can be generated by fault displacement beneath or around lake systems. Faulting shifts the ground in a vertical motion through reverse, normal or oblique strike slip faulting processes, this displaces the water above causing a tsunami (Figure 1). The reason strike-slip faulting does not cause tsunamis is because there is no vertical displacement within the fault movement, only lateral movement resulting in no displacement of the water. In an enclosed basin such as a lake, tsunamis are referred to as the initial wave produced by coseismic displacement from an earthquake, and the seiche as the harmonic resonance within the lake.

In order for a tsunami to be generated certain criteria are required:
Needs to occur just below the lake bottom.
Earthquake is of high or moderate magnitude typically over magnitude four.
Displaces a large enough volume of water to generate a tsunami.

These tsunamis are of high damage potential because they are contained within a relatively small body of water, and are near a field source. Warning time, after the event, is reduced, and organised emergency evacuations after the generation of the tsunami is difficult. On low lying shores even small waves may lead to substantial flooding. Residents should be made aware of emergency evacuation routes, in the event of an earthquake.

Lake Tahoe

Lake Tahoe may be endangered by a tsunami, due to faulting processes. Located in California and Nevada, it lies within an intermountain basin bounded by faults. Most of these faults are at the lake bottom or hidden in glaciofluvial deposits. Lake Tahoe has been effected by prehistoric eruptions, and in studies of the lake bottom sediments, a 10m high scarp has displaced the lake bottom sediments, indicating that the water was once displaced, generating a tsunami. A tsunami and seiche in Lake Tahoe can be treated as shallow-water long waves as the maximum water depth is much smaller than the wavelength. This demonstrates the impact that lakes have on tsunami wave characteristics, which is different from ocean tsunami wave characteristics because the ocean is deeper, and lakes are relatively shallow in comparison. With ocean tsunami, waves amplitudes only increase when the tsunami gets close to shore, however in lake tsunami, waves are generated and contained in a shallow environment.

This would have a major impact on the 34,000 permanent residences along the lake, and on tourism in the area. Tsunami run-ups would leave areas near the lake inundated due to permanent ground subsidence attributed to the earthquake, with the highest run-ups and amplitudes being attributed to the seiches rather than the actual tsunami. Seiches cause damage because of resonance within the bays, reflecting the waves, where they combine to make larger standing waves. Lake Tahoe also experienced a massive collapse of the western edge of the basin that formed McKinney Bay around 50,000 years ago. This was thought to have generated a tsunami/seiche wave with a height approaching .

Sub-aerial mass flows
Sub-aerial mass flows (landslides or rapid mass wasting) result when a large amount of sediment becomes unstable, as the result of shaking from an earthquake, or saturation of the sediment which initiates a sliding layer. The volume of sediment then flows into the lake, causing a sudden large displacement of water. Tsunamis generated by sub-aerial mass flows are defined in terms of the first initial wave being the tsunami wave, and any tsunamis in terms of sub-aerial mass flows, are characterised into three zones. A splash zone or wave generation zone, is the region where landslides and water motion are coupled and it extends as far as the landslide travels. Next, the near field area, which is based on the characteristics of the tsunami wave, such as amplitude and wavelength which are crucial for predictive purposes. Then the far field area, where the process is mainly influenced by dispersion characteristics and is not often used when investigating tsunamis in lakes. Most lake tsunamis are related only to near field processes.

A modern example of a landslide into a reservoir lake, overtopping a dam, occurred in Italy with the Vajont Dam disaster in 1963. Evidence exists in paleoseismological evidence and other sedimentary core sample proxies of catastrophic rock failures of landslide-triggered lake tsunamis worldwide, including in Lake Geneva during AD 563.

New Zealand example
In the event of the Alpine fault in New Zealand rupturing in the South Island, it is predicted that there would be shaking of approximately magnitude eight in the lake-side towns of Queenstown (Lake Wakatipu) and Wanaka (Lake Wanaka). These could possibly cause sub-aerial mass flows that could generate tsunamis within the lakes. This would have a devastating impact on the 28,224 residents (2013 New Zealand census) who occupy these lake towns, not only in the potential losses of life and property, but the damage to the booming tourism industry, which would require years to rebuild.

The Otago Regional Council, responsible for the area, has recognised that in such an event, tsunamis could occur in both lakes.

Volcanogenic processes

Tsunamis may be generated in lakes by volcanogenic processes, in terms of gas build-up causing violent lake overturns, and other processes such as pyroclastic flows, which require more complex modeling. Lake overturns can be incredibly dangerous and occur when gas, trapped at the bottom of the lake, is heated by rising magma, causing an explosion and release of  gas; an example of this is Lake Kivu.

Lake Kivu
Lake Kivu, one of the African Great Lakes, lies on the border between the Democratic Republic of the Congo and Rwanda, and is part of the East Africa Rift. As part of the rift, it is affected by volcanic activity beneath the lake. This has led to a buildup of methane and carbon dioxide at the bottom of the lake, which can lead to violent limnic eruptions.

Limnic eruptions (also called "lake overturns") are due to volcanic interaction with the water at the bottom of the lake that has high gas concentrations, this leads to heating of the lake and this rapid rise in temperature would spark a methane explosion displacing a large amount of water, followed nearly simultaneously by a release of carbon dioxide. This carbon dioxide would suffocate large numbers of people, with a possible tsunami generated from water displaced by the gas explosion affecting all of the 2 million people who occupy the shores of Lake Kivu. This is incredibly important as the warning times for an event such as a lake overturn is incredibly short in the order of minutes and the event itself may not even be noticed. Education of locals and preparation is crucial in this case and much research in this area has been done in order to try to understand what is happening within the lake, in order to try to reduce the effects when this phenomenon does happen.

A lake turn-over in Lake Kivu may occur from one of two scenarios. Either (1) up to another hundred years of gas accumulation leads to gas saturation in the lake, resulting in a spontaneous outburst of gas originating at the depth at which gas saturation has exceeded 100%, or (2) a volcanic or even seismic event triggers a turn-over. In either case a strong vertical lift of a large body of water results in a plume of gas bubbles and water rising up to and through the water surface. As the bubbling water column draws in fresh gas-laden water, the bubbling water column widens and becomes more energetic as a virtual "chain reaction" occurs which would look like a watery volcano. Very large volumes of water are displaced, vertically at first, then horizontally away from the centre at surface and horizontally inwards to the bottom of the bubbling water column, feeding in fresh gas-laden water. The speed of the rising column of water increases until it has the potential to rise 25m or more in the centre above lake level. The water column has the potential to widen to well in excess of a kilometre, in a violent disturbance of the whole lake. The watery volcano may take as much as a day to fully develop while it releases upwards of 400 billion cubic metres of gas (~12tcf). Some of these parameters are uncertain, particularly the time taken to release the gas and the height to which the water column can rise. As a secondary effect, particularly if the water column behaves irregularly with a series of surges, the lake surface will both rise by up to several metres and create a series of tsunamis or waves radiating away from the epicentre of the eruption. Surface waters may simultaneously race away from the epicentre at speeds as high as 20-40m/second, slowing as distances from the centre increase. The size of the waves created is unpredictable. Wave heights will be highest if the water column surges periodically, resulting in wave heights is great as 10-20m. This is caused by the ever-shifting pathway that the vertical column takes to the surface. No reliable model exists to predict this overall turnover behaviour. For tsunami precautions it will be necessary for people to move to high ground, at least 20m above lake level. A worse situation may pertain in the Ruzizi River where a surge in lake level would cause flash-flooding of the steeply sloping river valley dropping 700m to Lake Tanganyika, where it is possible that a wall of water from 20-50m high may race down the gorge. Water is not the only problem for residents of the Kivu basin; the more than 400 billion cubic metres of gas released creates a denser-than-air cloud which may blanket the whole valley to a depth of 300m or more. The presence of this opaque gas cloud, which would suffocate any living creatures with its mixture of carbon dioxide and methane laced with hydrogen sulphide, would cause the majority of casualties. Residents would be advised to climb to at least 400m above the lake level to ensure their safety. Strangely the risk of a gas explosion is not great as the gas cloud is only about 20% methane in carbon dioxide, a mixture that is difficult to ignite.

Modern example

Askja

At 11:24 PM on 21 July 2014, in a period experiencing an earthquake swarm related to the upcoming eruption of Bárðarbunga, an 800m-wide section gave way on the slopes of the Icelandic volcano Askja. Beginning at 350m over water height, it caused a tsunami 20–30 meters high across the caldera, and potentially larger at localized points of impact. Thanks to the late hour, no tourists were present; however, search and rescue observed a steam cloud rising from the volcano, apparently geothermal steam released by the landslide. Whether geothermal activity played a role in the landslide is  uncertain. A total of 30–50 million cubic meters was involved in the landslide, raising the caldera's water level by 1–2 meters.

Spirit Lake

On March 27, 1980, Mount St. Helens erupted and Spirit Lake received the full impact of the lateral blast from the volcano.

Hazard mitigation
Hazard mitigation for tsunamis in lakes is immensely important in the preservation of life, infrastructure and property. In order for hazard management of tsunamis in lakes to function at full capacity there are four aspects that need to be balanced and interacted with each other, these are:

Readiness (preparedness for a tsunami in the lake)
Evacuation plans
Making sure equipment and supplies are on standby in case of a tsunami
Education of locals on what hazard is posed to them and what they need to do in the event of a tsunami in the lake
Response to the tsunami event in the lake
Rescue operations
Getting aid into the area such as food and medical equipment
Providing temporary housing for people who have been displaced.
Recovery from the tsunami
Re-establishing damaged road networks and infrastructure
Re-building and/or relocation for damaged buildings
Cleanup of debris and flooded areas of land.
Reduction (plans to reduce the effects of the next tsunami)
Putting in place land use zoning to provide a buffer for tsunami run ups, meaning that buildings cannot be built right on the lake shore.

When all these aspects are taken into consideration and continually managed and maintained, the vulnerability of an area to a tsunami within the lake decreases. This is not because the hazard itself has decreased but the awareness of the people who would be affected makes them more prepared to deal with the situation when it does occur. This reduces recovery and response times for an area, decreasing the amount of disruption and in turn the effect the disaster has on the community.

Future research
Investigation into the phenomena of tsunamis in lakes for this article was restricted by certain limitations. Internationally there has been a fair amount of research into certain lakes but not all lakes that can be affected by the phenomenon have been covered. This is especially true for New Zealand with the possible occurrence of tsunamis in the major lakes recognised as a hazard, but with no further research completed.

See also
Disaster preparedness
Historic tsunami
Ice jam
Megatsunami (lists several lake incidents)
Mount Breakenridge
Quick clay
Seiche
Tsunami Society

Footnotes

References
Walder J.S, et al.; 2003; Tsunamis generated by subaerial mass flows; JOURNAL OF GEOPHYSICAL RESEARCH, VOL. 108, NO. B5, 2236, 
Ichinose G.A, et al.; 2000; The potential hazard from tsunami and seiche waves generated by large earthquakes within Lake Tahoe, California-Nevada; GEOPHYSICAL RESEARCH LETTERS, VOL XX, NO. X, PAGES XXXX-XXXX
Freundt Armin et al. 2007; Volcanogenic tsunamis in lakes : Examples from Nicaragua and general implications; Pure and Applied Geophysics; ,CODEN PAGYAV, Springer, Basel, SUISSE (1964) (Revue)
Heller, V., Hager, W.H., Minor, H.-E. (2009). Landslide generated impulse waves in reservoirs – Basics and computation. VAW Mitteilung 211, Boes, R. ed. ETH Zurich, Zurich

Limnology
Lake
Water waves
Natural hazards